Lady General Hua Mu-lan is a 1964 Hong Kong Huangmei opera musical film, directed by Yueh Feng, depicting the story of Hua Mulan.

Synopsis 
Barbarian hordes had invaded and the border towns were overrun. The call went out for able-bodied men to join the army. Hua Mulan returned home from her hunting to find that her frail father had been summoned. Her brother was too young to enlist, so she volunteered to take her father's place but her parents rejected the idea. Determined to convince her father, she conspired with her cousin and elder sister. Dressed as a man, she sparred with her father. Both astonished and impressed, he gave her his blessings to join the army.

With her cousin accompanying her, she joined the ranks of army recruits and managed to impress the General in the recruits martial trials. In the 12 years of fighting, she rose through the ranks and attained the status of general. Through this period, she became fast friends with the group of recruits she was with and General Li. The war eventually drew to a close with an ambush and capture of the barbarian king. The Commanding General of the army threw a celebratory feast, after which, he drew Mulan aside to discuss a matter with her. He was especially impressed with her abilities and character and wished to betroth his daughter to Mulan. Unable to reveal the truth about her identity and reluctant to refuse him outright for fear of offending him, Mulan dodged the issue by pretending to be feeling weak from her wound received in the last battle.

A few days later, having officially resigned her post, she took leave of her comrades and returned home with her cousin. The Commanding General, however, had not forgotten the proposal and was determined to have Mulan as a son-in-law and served in the government. He sent General Li with some of her comrades bearing wedding gifts to her home. When they arrived, they were shocked and astonished to find that their courageous and heroic comrade turned out to be a lady.

General Li agreed to explain to the Commanding General on Mulan's behalf. Before he left, he exchanged betrothal tokens with Mulan, exhorting her to wait for him.

Cast

Huangmei opera dubbing 
 Ivy Ling Po - Hua Mulan
 Kiang Hung - General Li

Characters 
 Ivy Ling Po as Hua Mulan
 Chin Han as General Li
 Yang Chi-ching as Master Hua
 Chen Yen-yen as Madam Hua
 Ching Miao as Commanding General

Festivals and awards
The film was screened at the 11th Asian Film Festival in 1964, awarding Best Actress honors to Ivy Ling Po.

Other adaptations 
The story of Hua Mulan is well known in Chinese literature. Another musical adaptation of her story is the 1998 animated Disney film Mulan.

External links
 
 

Films about Hua Mulan
1964 films
Hong Kong musical films
1960s Mandarin-language films
Shaw Brothers Studio films
1964 musical films
Cross-dressing in film
Huangmei opera films
Films set in the Northern and Southern dynasties
Films directed by Yueh Feng